Zvonimir Deranja (born 22 September 1979) is a retired Croatian footballer who last played for RNK Split.

Club career
He began his football career with local clubs NK Slaven from Gruda and HNK Dubrovnik. He was discovered by Hajduk Split scouts and moved to the club's youth squad. In 1996, he joined the club's senior squad in the Croatian First League. He remained with the club until 2004, returning the following season after an unsuccessful year in France. In 2006, he moved to the French Ligue 2 again, this time with FC Libourne-Saint-Seurin, with whom he received more frequent playing time.

International career
Deranja has not been capped for the Croatian national team. However, he has played extensively for the country's junior sides. He was a member of the Croatian side at the 1999 FIFA World Youth Championship squads.

References

External links
 
 
 
 
 

1979 births
Living people
Sportspeople from Dubrovnik
Association football forwards
Croatian footballers
Croatia youth international footballers
Croatia under-21 international footballers
HNK Hajduk Split players
Le Mans FC players
FC Libourne players
Royal Excel Mouscron players
RNK Split players
Croatian Football League players
Ligue 2 players
Belgian Pro League players
Croatian expatriate footballers
Expatriate footballers in France
Croatian expatriate sportspeople in France
Expatriate footballers in Belgium
Croatian expatriate sportspeople in Belgium